The 2021 Portugal Tri-Nation Series was a Twenty20 International (T20I) cricket tournament that took place in Portugal between 19 and 22 August 2021. The participating teams were the hosts Portugal, along with Gibraltar and Malta. The matches were played at the Gucherre Cricket Ground, in Albergaria, near to the city of Santarém. These were the first official T20I matches to be played in Portugal since the International Cricket Council (ICC) granted full T20I status to all competitive matches between its members from 1 January 2019.

Portugal won the tournament with a perfect record. In the fourth match of the tournament, Maltese pair Bikram Arora and Varun Thamotharam set a new record fourth-wicket partnership in T20Is, when they added an unbeaten 166 runs against Gibraltar.

Squads

Round-robin

Points table

Fixtures

References

External links
 Series home at ESPNcricinfo

Associate international cricket competitions in 2021